Frederick Henry Kaiser (October 31, 1889 – February 17, 1928) was an American track and field athlete. He competed in the 10 km walk at the 1912 Summer Olympics but he did not finish the race.

References

1889 births
1928 deaths
American male racewalkers
Olympic track and field athletes of the United States
Athletes (track and field) at the 1912 Summer Olympics